The 2006 Bexley Council election took place on 4 May 2006 to elect members of Bexley London Borough Council in London, England. The whole council was up for election and the Conservative Party gained control of the council from the Labour Party.

Election result

Ward results

Barnehurst

Belvedere

Blackfen and Lamorbey

Blendon and Penhill

Brampton

Christchurch

Colyers

Cray Meadows

Crayford

Danson Park

East Wickham

Erith

Falconwood and Welling

Lesnes Abbey

Longlands

North End

Northumberland Heath

St Mary's

St Michael's

Sidcup

Thamesmead East

References

Bexley
Council elections in the London Borough of Bexley